Topley Landing Provincial Park is a provincial park near Topley Landing in British Columbia, Canada.

Climate

References

Provincial parks of British Columbia
Regional District of Bulkley-Nechako